Chase Spencer Yaklin, better known by his stage name Chase Bryant (born October 9, 1992) is an American singer and songwriter. Bryant is a family name shared by his grandfather, Jimmy Bryant, who performed with Roy Orbison and Waylon Jennings.

In early 2015 Bryant's debut single, "Take It On Back", became a top 10 single on the Country Airplay chart, which is published weekly by Billboard. Bryant co-wrote and co-produced his debut EP, featuring the second single "Little Bit of You", which came out on September 23, 2014, on Red Bow Records.

Musical career 
Bryant is the grandson of Jimmy Bryant, who performed with Roy Orbison, and the nephew of Jeff and Junior Bryant, co-founders of the group Ricochet.

In August 2013, Bryant signed with Red Bow Records, a division of Broken Bow Records. A year later, he released his debut single "Take It On Back", which has charted in the top 10 of Billboards Country Airplay chart. The EP album's second single, "Little Bit of You" released to country radio on March 30, 2015. "Room to Breathe", was released to country radio on July 4, 2016.

Bryant began touring with Brantley Gilbert in early 2015. After that Bryant was one of two opening acts, along with Billy Currington, on Tim McGraw's 2015 Shotgun Rider Tour. After leaving Broken Bow, Bryant self-released the album Upbringing in 2021.

Musical stylings
Bryant is left-handed but plays a right-handed guitar upside-down.

Discography

Studio albums

Extended plays

Singles

Music videos

References

1993 births
American country singer-songwriters
American male singer-songwriters
BBR Music Group artists
Living people
People from Jim Wells County, Texas
Singer-songwriters from Texas
Country musicians from Texas
21st-century American male singers
21st-century American singers